Su Rongzai (born November 29, 1975) is a Chinese Grand Prix motorcycle racer.

Career statistics

By season

Races by year
(key)

References

External links
 Profile on motogp.com

1975 births
Living people
Chinese motorcycle racers
250cc World Championship riders
Sportspeople from Guangzhou